Liu Bin is the name of:

Liu Bin (Southern Han) (920–943), Southern Han emperor
Liu Bin (footballer, born 1991), Chinese footballer
Liu Bin (footballer, born 1998), Chinese footballer

See also
Liu Bing (disambiguation)